Narcissa is a census-designated place (CDP) in Ottawa County, Oklahoma, United States. The population was 100 at the 2000 census.  Narcissa is part of the Joplin, Missouri metropolitan area.

Historic U.S. Route 66 ran through it.  The Narcissa D-X Gas Station is listed on the National Register of Historic Places.

Geography
Narcissa is located approximately five miles south-southwest of Miami on U.S. Route 66.

Demographics

As of the census of 2000, there were 100 people, 41 households, and 27 families residing in the CDP. The population density was 24.2 people per square mile (9.3/km2). There were 42 housing units at an average density of 10.1/sq mi (3.9/km2). The racial makeup of the CDP was 84.00% White, 11.00% Native American, 2.00% Asian, and 3.00% from two or more races. Hispanic or Latino of any race were 1.00% of the population.

There were 41 households, out of which 26.8% had children under the age of 18 living with them, 56.1% were married couples living together, 4.9% had a female householder with no husband present, and 34.1% were non-families. 31.7% of all households were made up of individuals, and 19.5% had someone living alone who was 65 years of age or older. The average household size was 2.44 and the average family size was 2.93.

In the CDP, the population was spread out, with 25.0% under the age of 18, 9.0% from 18 to 24, 19.0% from 25 to 44, 33.0% from 45 to 64, and 14.0% who were 65 years of age or older. The median age was 42 years. For every 100 females, there were 122.2 males. For every 100 females age 18 and over, there were 108.3 males.

The median income for a household in the CDP was $31,500, and the median income for a family was $40,000. Males had a median income of $20,625 versus $22,083 for females. The per capita income for the CDP was $14,852. There were 7.7% of families and 9.1% of the population living below the poverty line, including 17.6% of under eighteens and none of those over 64.

Education
It is within Afton Public Schools.

See also

 List of census-designated places in Oklahoma

References

External links

Census-designated places in Ottawa County, Oklahoma
Census-designated places in Oklahoma